Cooks Brook is a small community found in the Southwest Branch Musquodoboit of the Musquodoboit Valley in Nova Scotia, Canada.  Cooks Brook is located along the Halifax Regional Municipality/Colchester County border.

References 
Explore HRM

Communities in Halifax, Nova Scotia
General Service Areas in Nova Scotia